Chahar Bid-e Sartang (also Romanized as Chahār Bīd-e Sartang) is a village in Par Zeytun Rural District, Meymand District, Firuzabad County, Fars Province, Iran. At the 2006 census, its population was 179, in 43 families.

References 

Populated places in Firuzabad County